Ellen Swift  is a British archaeologist and Professor of Roman Archaeology at the University of Kent.

Professor Swift studied at the Institute of Archaeology, University College London for her BA, MA, and PhD.

Swift is a specialist in material culture studies of the Roman world, including dress accessories and functional artefacts including dice. She was elected a Fellow of the Society of Antiquaries of London in October 2005. In 2001, the Theoretical Roman Archaeology Conference formed a standing committee to oversee the conference, consisting of Swift, Martin Carruthers, Carol van Driel-Murray, Andrew Gardner, Jason Lucas, and Louise Revell. The committee also edited the proceedings for the 2001 conference.

Publications
 Swift, E. (2017). Roman Artefacts and Society: Design, Behaviour and Experience. Oxford: Oxford University Press.
 Swift, E. (2009). Style and Function in Roman Decoration: Living with Objects and Interiors. Farnham, Surrey: Ashgate.
 Swift, E. (2003). "Transformation in Meaning: Amber and Glass Beads Across the Roman Frontier", Proceedings of the Twelfth Annual Theoretical Roman Archaeology Conference, Canterbury 2002. 48–57.  
 Swift, E. (2000). Regionality in Dress Accessories in the Late Roman West. Montagnac: Editions Monique Mergoil.
 Swift, E. (2000). The End of the Western Roman Empire: An Archaeological Investigation''. Stroud: Tempus.

References

External links

Staff profile at the University of Kent
Interview with Ellen Swift on the Coffee & Circuses podcast

Fellows of the Society of Antiquaries of London
Living people
British women archaeologists
Classical archaeologists
British archaeologists
Women classical scholars
Academics of the University of Kent
British women historians
Year of birth missing (living people)